Legs and Boots is a series of Tori Amos live albums recorded during the North American leg of the American Doll Posse Tour. Amos announced the launch of the series on October 16, 2007, stating that each show in the series would be available via  digital download in MP3 format within a few hours after each show, and in CD-quality FLAC format within a week. Some sets contained photos from backstage or onstage from the concert, some also contained soundcheck recordings as extras. A total of 27 shows were recorded from October 13 to December 12, 2007.  All 27 shows were made available on iTunes USA on July 22, 2008, and on iTunes international, Rhapsody, Napster, and other online vendors on August 5.

Shows

Bonus Tracks
Two tracks from the tour, but not released for purchase as part of Legs And Boots were freely made available in December 2007 via Tori's official mailing list for mp3 download. These tracks were "Not David Bowie" (performed 28th November 2007 in Denver, Colorado) and "Amber Waves" (Performed 29 November 2007 in Salt Lake City, Utah).

Artwork

The artwork included in each release corresponds with the persona or "doll" Amos used during the first part of the respective concert.

Personnel
 Tori Amos – vocals, piano, organ, keyboard
 Dan Phelps – guitar, congas, mandolin
 Jon Evans – bass
 Matt Chamberlain – drums

External links

Tori Amos live albums
Live album series
2000s live albums
2007 live albums